Ganjabad (also Romanized as Ganjābād; also known as Şādeqābād) is a village in Dasht-e Bil Rural District, in the Central District of Oshnavieh County, West Azerbaijan Province, Iran. At the 2006 census, its population was 67, in 15 families.

References 

Populated places in Oshnavieh County